Marcel Ribère (16 March 1900 - 12 February 1966) was a French politician.

Ribère was born in Souk Ahras, Algeria. He represented the Popular Republican Movement (MRP) in the Constituent Assembly elected in 1945 and the Rally of the French People (RPF) in the National Assembly from 1951 to 1955.

References

1900 births
1966 deaths
People from Souk Ahras
People of French Algeria
Pieds-Noirs
Popular Republican Movement politicians
Rally of the French People politicians
Members of the Constituent Assembly of France (1945)
Deputies of the 2nd National Assembly of the French Fourth Republic
French military personnel of World War II
Free French military personnel of World War II